Pericopsis is a genus of legume in the family Fabaceae.

Species
Pericopsis comprises the following species:
 Pericopsis angolensis (Baker) Meeuwen
 Pericopsis elata (Harms) Meeuwen—African teak
 Pericopsis laxiflora (Baker) Meeuwen
 Pericopsis mooniana Thwaites—Nandu wood

References

Faboideae
Taxonomy articles created by Polbot
Fabaceae genera